I is the third full-length studio album by Swedish rock band Nightingale. The album is a prequel to The Breathing Shadow story from the first two albums.

Track listing
 "Scarred for Life" - 3:58
 "Still in the Dark" - 3:12
 "The Game" - 4:29
 "Game Over" - 3:06
 "Remorse and Regret" - 5:02
 "Alonely" - 4:15
 "I Return" - 4:03
 "Drowning in Sadness" - 3:32
 "Dead or Alive" - 3:27
 "The Journey's End" - 5:23
 "Breathing" - 2:45

Credits
Nightingale
 Dan Swanö - vocals, rhythm guitar, keyboards, drums
 Dag Swanö - bass guitar, lead guitar, keyboards

References

Nightingale (band) albums
2000 albums